Bhim Singh is an Indian retired heavyweight freestyle wrestler. In 1966 he won a gold medal at the Commonwealth Games and a Gold at the Asian Games, and received the Arjuna Award. He should not be confused with fellow wrestlers Bishambar Singh and Bishwanath Singh who competed in the same period, but in different weight categories.

References

Possibly living people
Indian male sport wrestlers
Wrestlers at the 1966 Asian Games
Wrestlers at the 1966 British Empire and Commonwealth Games
Commonwealth Games gold medallists for India
Commonwealth Games medallists in wrestling
Asian Games bronze medalists for India
Asian Games medalists in wrestling
Medalists at the 1966 Asian Games
Recipients of the Arjuna Award
Medallists at the 1966 British Empire and Commonwealth Games